Silliman is a surname. Notable people with the surname include:

 Aldine Silliman Kieffer (1840–1904), American musician
 Benjamin Silliman (1779–1864), American chemist
 Benjamin Silliman Jr. (1816–1885), American chemist
Benjamin D. Silliman (1805–1901), American lawyer and politician
 Gold Selleck Silliman (1732–1790), American attorney and Revolutionary War figure
 Horace Brinsmade Silliman (1825-1910), founder of Silliman University
 Jael Silliman, American writer
 Randolph Silliman Bourne (1886–1918), American writer
 Robert Hillyer aka Robert Silliman Hillyer (1895–1961), American poet
 Ron Silliman (born 1946), American poet

See also
 Silliman College at Yale University
 Silliman University, Dumaguete City, Philippines
 USC&GS Silliman

See also
 Sillimanite